Henry J. O'Keeffe (December 12, 1923 – December 27, 2011) was an American professional basketball player. He played for the Syracuse Nationals in the National Basketball League and the Wilkes-Barre Barons in the American Basketball League. 

O'Keeffe's college career was split between Canisius College and Rensselaer Polytechnic Institute (RPI), with him serving in World War II during this time. In his post-basketball career, O'Keeffe began his own insurance agency in Buffalo, New York and then worked as a real estate agent in Sarasota, Florida. He retired in Savannah, Georgia. O'Keeffe was married twice and had six children.

References

1923 births
2011 deaths
All-American college men's basketball players
American men's basketball players
Basketball players from New York (state)
Basketball players from Savannah, Georgia
Canisius Golden Griffins men's basketball players
Forwards (basketball)
Malverne High School alumni
People from Malverne, New York
RPI Engineers men's basketball players
Syracuse Nationals players
United States Navy personnel of World War II
Wilkes-Barre Barons players